This article contains information about the literary events and publications of 1801.

Events
April 1 – A letter from "the author of Génie du christianisme" (François-René de Chateaubriand) is published in Le Publiciste, Chateaubriand having returned to France the previous year under an amnesty issued to émigrés.
April 2 – Battle of Copenhagen: In recognition of the English attack on Copenhagen, Adam Oehlenschläger produces his first dramatic sketch April the Second 1801.
April – John Borthwick Gilchrist is appointed a professor at Fort William College in Calcutta, India, where he establishes the Hindusthani Press.
May – Jane Austen moves with her family to Bath.
unknown dates
The second edition of Specimens of the Early English Poets, edited by George Ellis and covering poems from the Old English through to the 17th century, is influential in acquainting the general reading public with Middle English poetry, going through a further 4 editions.
The first complete Bible translation into Scottish Gaelic, Am Bìoball Gàidhlig, is published.

New books

Fiction
François-René de Chateaubriand – Atala 
Sophie Ristaud Cottin – Malvina
Anne Seymour Damer – Belmour
Maria Edgeworth – Belinda
Elizabeth Helme – St. Margaret's Cave
Rachel Hunter – Letitia
Isabella Kelly – Ruthinglenne
Sophia King – The Fatal Secret
Mary Meeke – Which is the Man
Amelia Opie – The Father and Daughter
Eliza Parsons – The Peasant of Ardenne Forest

Children
Christoph von Schmid – Biblische Geschichte für Kinder (Bible Stories for Children)
Priscilla Wakefield – The Juvenile Travellers: Containing the Remarks of a Family during a Tour through the Principal States and Kingdoms of Europe

Drama
Heinrich Joseph von Collin – Regulus
George Colman the Younger – The Poor Gentleman 
William Godwin – Abbas, King of Persia (written)
Matthew Lewis 
 Adelmorn, the Outlaw
 Alfonso, King of Castile
Thomas Moore and Michael Kelly (tenor) – The Gypsy Prince
Friedrich Schiller
The Maid of Orleans (Die Jungfrau von Orleans)
Maria Stuart

Poetry
Henry James Pye – Alfred
William Wordsworth and Samuel Taylor Coleridge – Lyrical Ballads (2nd edition, dated 1800)

Non-fiction
Francis Barrett – The Magus, or Celestial Intelligencer
Elizabeth Hamilton – Letters on the Elementary Principles of Education
Arthur Murphy – Life of David Garrick
Jane West – Letters to a Young Man

Births
February 16 – Frederic Madden, English palaeographer (died 1873)
February 21 – Cardinal John Henry Newman, English theologian and autobiographer (died 1890)
March 4 – Karl Rudolf Hagenbach, Swiss theologian and historian (died 1874)
March 15 – George Perkins Marsh, American philologist (died 1882)
May 9 – Ulrika von Strussenfelt, Swedish novelist (died 1873)
May 31 – Johann Georg Baiter, Swiss philologist and textual critic (died 1877)
August 10 – Christian Hermann Weisse, German Protestant religious philosopher (died 1866)
September 4 – Alfred d'Orsay, French wit and dandy (died 1852)
September 7 – Hortense Allart, Milanese-born French feminist novelist (died 1879)
November 3 – Karl Baedeker, German guidebook publisher (died 1859)
November 10 – Vladimir Dal, Russian lexicographer (died 1872)
November 22 – Abraham Hayward, English man of letters (died 1884)
November 24 – Ludwig Bechstein, German writer and collector of folk tales (died 1860)
December 4 – Karl Ludwig Michelet, German philosopher (died 1893)
December 7 – Johann Nestroy, Austrian dramatist (died 1862)
December 11 – Christian Dietrich Grabbe, German dramatist (died 1836)
December 12 – Edward Moxon, English poet and publisher (died 1858)

Deaths
January 2 – Johann Kaspar Lavater, Swiss poet (born 1741)
January 9 – Margaretta Faugères, American playwright, poet and political activist (born 1771)
January 13 – Robert Orme, English historian of India (born 1728)
March 14 – Ignacy Krasicki, Polish poet and prince-bishop (born 1735)
March 21 – John Holt, English scholar (born 1743)
March 25 – Novalis, German poet (born 1772)
April 11 – Antoine de Rivarol, French scholar and epigrammatist (born 1753)
September 1 – Robert Bage, English novelist (born 1728)
September 7 – Giovanni Andrea Lazzarini, Italian painter, poet and art historian (born 1710)
September 23 – Thomas Nowell, Welsh-born controversialist and historian (born c. 1730)
December 25 – Hester Chapone, English writer of conduct books (born 1727)

References

 
Years of the 19th century in literature